Aranza Vázquez Montaño (born 21 August 2002) is a Mexican diver. She represented Mexico at the 2020 Summer Olympics in the individual 3-metre springboard.

College career  

Vázquez attends the University of North Carolina, majoring in Exercise Science. She is the two-time ACC champion in the 10-metre platform and 3-metre springboard and was named the 2021 ACC Women's Diver of the Year. In the 2021 NCAA Championships, she placed second in the 1-metre and 3-metre springboard and sixth on the 10-metre platform. In the 2022 NCAA Championships, she placed third on the 1-metre platform.  

In the 2023 NCAA Championships, Vázquez won both the 1-metre and the 3-metre events, becoming the first North Carolina diver to win a national title.

International career 

Vázquez began her international career with the 2017 FINA Diving Grand Prix, before participating in the 1-metre springboard event at the 2019 World Aquatics Championships in Gwangju, South Korea. She placed fourth at the 2021 FINA Diving World Cup, qualifying for the her first Olympic Games. At the 2020 Summer Olympics, she placed sixth in the 3 metre springboard event.

Personal life 
Vázquez has a younger brother, Rodolfo, who also dives for the North Carolina Tar Heels.

References 

Living people
2002 births
Mexican female divers
Olympic divers of Mexico
Divers at the 2020 Summer Olympics
Sportspeople from Baja California Sur
People from La Paz, Baja California Sur
21st-century Mexican women